The Cornwall College Group (TCCG) is a further education college situated on eight sites throughout Cornwall and Devon, England, United Kingdom, with its head office in St Austell.

Campuses
There are eight campuses within the Cornwall College group, at Camborne, Newquay, Sisna Park, St Austell, Duchy College, Rosewarne and Stoke Climsland, Bicton College and Falmouth Marine School.

Since 2000 Newquay Zoo has provided teaching input and practical opportunities for FE and HE students enrolled at the adjacent Newquay Centre for Applied Zoology Cornwall College Newquay on zoological conservation, education and media courses. The campus is based next to Newquay Zoo. This unusual and innovative partnership project was recognised by a BIAZA zoo education award in 2003 and 2016.

Courses
With more than 15,000 learners each year, The Cornwall College Group teaches more apprenticeships, more adult learners and more HE in FE learners than any other college in Devon and Cornwall.

It offers in excess of 2,000 technical and professional qualifications, alongside GCSEs and Access to Higher Education.

Courses are offered in Arts, Media & Performing Arts; Business, Administration & Law; Catering & Hospitality; Construction Trades; Conservation, Zoology and Animal Behaviour; Early Years; Engineering; Hair, Beauty & Wellbeing; Information & Communication Technology; Motor Vehicle; Foundation Learning plus English & Maths; Public Services; Science; Social Care & Health; Sport, Fitness & Outdoor; Travel & Tourism; and the School of Education and Professional Development.

Awards
In 2016, it was one of just two colleges to be awarded the Queen's Anniversary Prize for Further and Higher Education.

Alumni
See :Category:People educated at Cornwall College
 John Barnes, 5th Baron Gorell, Chartered surveyor
Richard David James, Grammy-winning musician

See also

 David Law, Tennis Podcast Cornwall College Students' Union

References

Further education colleges in Cornwall
Further education colleges in the Collab Group
Combined Universities in Cornwall